Gimson and Company were founded in 1840 by Josiah and Benjamin Gimson on Welford Road in Leicester. The company were listed as Engineers, Ironfounders, Boiler Makers & General Machinists. They later moved to Vulcan Works, Vulcan Road, Humberstone Road, Leicester.

Expansion
Between 1876 and 1878 a new works, Vulcan Foundry, was developed beside the Midland Railway mainline. The site covered three and a half acres, the foundry shop was 180 ft by 62 ft. It had a workforce of 350 men and all lifting was done with steam hoists and travelling cranes.

Products 
Stationary steam engines, passenger and goods lifts, boot and shoe machinery, agricultural machinery.

Preserved steam engines 
Woolf compound rotative beam pumping engines;
 Four of 1885 at Claymills Pumping Station, Burton on Trent.
 Four of 1891 at Abbey Pumping Station, Leicester 

Single-cylinder condensing rotative beam pumping engines of 1879;
 One at Snibston Discovery Park, Coalville, Leics
 One at Forncett Industrial Steam Museum, Forncett St. Mary, Norfolk 

Horizontal single cylinder;
 12"×24" of 1895 Snibston Discovery Museum
 Engine of 1899 at Hall & Woodhouse., Brewery, Blandford St. Mary, Dorset.

Wall-mounted vertical single cylinder lift engine; 
 One at Abbey Pumping Station, Leicester

References 

 GracesGuide.co.uk
 LE.ac.uk
 InternalFire.com
 Leicester Foundries 1845-1914 pp.63-68 Retrieved 27 April 2014.
Steam engine manufacturers
Manufacturing companies based in Leicester
Foundries in the United Kingdom
Industrial buildings in England